Streptomyces xinghaiensis is a bacterium species from the genus of Streptomyces which has been isolated from marine sediments from Xinghai Bay near Dalian in China.

See also 
 List of Streptomyces species

References

Further reading

External links
Type strain of Streptomyces xinghaiensis at BacDive – the Bacterial Diversity Metadatabase

xinghaiensis
Bacteria described in 2009